NetherLines B.V. was a commuter airline that was a subsidiary of the Royal Nedlloyd Group. It merged with NLM CityHopper in 1991 to form KLM Cityhopper.

Company history

Netherlines was founded in April 1984 under the full name of Netherlines Airlines For European Commuter Services BV and began services using Jetstream 31 aircraft on a route between Amsterdam and Luxembourg.  Other cities served throughout the years were Eindhoven, Enschede, Rotterdam, Groningen, Cologne, Münster, Lille, Birmingham, East Midlands, Luton and Southampton.

Netherlines also used the Saab 340 to open a route to Vienna.

KLM acquired Netherlines in April 1988; the combined Netherlines-NLM Cityhopper operation was NLM CityHopper/Netherlines, and it had its head office in Building 70 at Amsterdam Airport Schiphol.

The operations of Netherlines were merged with NLM Cityhopper, and the combined company became KLM CityHopper on 1 April 1991.

Fleet details

6 Jetstream 31
3 Saab 340

External links
Code information

References

Defunct airlines of the Netherlands
Airlines established in 1984
Airlines disestablished in 1991
Air France–KLM
Dutch companies established in 1984